Radha Govinda Baruah College, established in 1978, is an undergraduate, coeducational college situated at Fatasil Ambari in Guwahati, Assam. This college is affiliated with the Gauhati University.

Departments

 Assamese
 Bengali
 English
History
Education
Economics
Philosophy
Political Science
Hindi
Mathematics
Commerce
Management
Finance
Computer Science and Application

References

External links
http://www.rgbaruahcollege.ac.in

Universities and colleges in Guwahati
Colleges affiliated to Gauhati University
Educational institutions established in 1978
1978 establishments in Assam